Paul Haarhuis and Yevgeny Kafelnikov were the defending champions, but Kafelnikov chose to not compete this year in order to focus on the singles tournament.

Haarhuis teamed up with Sandon Stolle and ended the tournament as runners-up, being defeated by Nicklas Kulti and Mikael Tillström 6–2, 6–7(2–7), 7–6(7–5) in the final.

Seeds
The top four seeds received a bye into the second round.

Draw

Finals

Top half

Bottom half

References
 Official Results Archive (ATP)
 Official Results Archive (ITF)

2000 Torneo Godó
Doubles